Kay Wenschlag (born 25 February 1970) is a German former professional footballer who played as a defender.

External links

1970 births
Living people
People from East Berlin
Association football defenders
Footballers from Berlin
German footballers
East German footballers
SV Werder Bremen II players
SV Werder Bremen players
FC Hansa Rostock players
FC Energie Cottbus players
VfL Osnabrück players
Holstein Kiel players
2. Bundesliga players